Willesden Green is a London Underground station on Walm Lane in Willesden. It is served by the Jubilee line and is between Dollis Hill and Kilburn stations.  Metropolitan line trains also pass through the station, but do not usually stop. The station is in both Travelcard Zone 2 and Zone 3.

History
The station opened on 24 November 1879 on the Metropolitan Railway (later the Metropolitan line). From 1894 to 1938 it was known as Willesden Green and Cricklewood. From 20 November 1939 it also served the Stanmore branch of the Bakerloo line, with Met services being withdrawn the following year. It transferred to the Jubilee line in 1979. A connecting tunnel at Embankment tube station mistakenly shows Willesden Green as part of the Bakerloo line as a result of a typo which instead should say Willesden Junction. This can be found on a printed map on the wall of Embankment station.

The main station buildings, which date from the reconstruction of 1925, are fine examples of the work of Charles Walter Clark, the Metropolitan Railway's architect, who used this style of marble white faience for several 'central' area stations. The diamond-shaped clock is also a trademark of his style. The ticket hall interior, which retains much of the original green tesserae mosaic tiling, is a rare survival and was one of the reasons that led to the station being made a Grade II Listed Building in December 2006.

Willesden Green is one of the few stations on the southern section of the former Metropolitan Main line to still have its original platform buildings intact and its architecture is typical for a station serving a medium-sized town. Baker Street and Neasden are the other stations to have their platform buildings intact. The line between Finchley Road and Harrow-on-the-Hill was quadrupled between 1914 and 1916, and many intermediate stations had to be rebuilt to enable the fast lines to be built.

A goods yard, which was in use until 1966, was located to the north of the station. From 1933, when the London Passenger Transport Board (LPTB) took over service, trains from the north would be run by the LNER to Neasden Depot where they would be then hauled by LPTB steam locos to Willesden.

Services
There are frequent Jubilee line trains at Willesden Green. Jubilee line trains heading southbound terminate at North Greenwich or Stratford. It previously served Charing Cross until 1999, when the Jubilee line extension isolated the station from the rest of the line. Those heading northbound either terminate here, at Wembley Park or Stanmore. Willesden Green is also served as part of the Night Tube, which is run overnight on Fridays and Saturdays.

The station still has side platforms for the Metropolitan line, but these are not in regular use and are only used when the Jubilee line is not serving the station due to planned engineering works or severe service disruption.

Connections
London Buses routes 260, 266 and 460 serve the station.

Gallery

References

Jubilee line stations
London Underground Night Tube stations
Tube stations in the London Borough of Brent
Former Metropolitan Railway stations
Railway stations in Great Britain opened in 1879
Willesden
Grade II listed buildings in the London Borough of Brent
Charles Walter Clark railway stations